These are the New Territories West results of the 1998 Hong Kong legislative election. The election was held on 24 May 1998 and all 6 seats in the newly established New Territories West, which consists of Tsuen Wan District, Tuen Mun District, Yuen Long District, Kwai Tsing District and Islands District, were contested. The Democratic Party became the biggest victors by winning two seats with Lee Wing-tat and Albert Ho, which was followed by Democratic Alliance for the Betterment of Hong Kong's Tam Yiu-chung and The Frontier's Lee Cheuk-yan and independent Leung Yiu-chung.

Overall results
After election:

Candidates list

See also
Legislative Council of Hong Kong
Hong Kong legislative elections
1998 Hong Kong legislative election

References

Elections in Hong Kong
1998 Hong Kong legislative election